Jassargus is a genus of leafhoppers belonging to the family Cicadellidae. The genus was first described by Zachvatkin in 1934. The species of this genus are found in Europe, Asia, Algeria, Greenland and Canada.

Species 
There are currently over 20 described species in Jassargus:
 Jassargus allobrogicus 
 Jassargus alpinus 
Jassargus altaicus 
Jassargus bavaricus 
Jassargus bisubulatus 
Jassargus caucasicus 
Jassargus cordiger 
Jassargus cylindrius 
Jassargus danielssoni 
Jassargus dentatus 
Jassargus heptapotamicus 
Jassargus japheticus 
Jassargus lagrecai 
Jassargus lunaris 
Jassargus prometheus 
Jassargus pseudocellaris 
Jassargus recens 
Jassargus refractus 
Jassargus remanei 
Jassargus remotus 
 Jassargus sursumflexus 
Jassargus svaneticus

References

Deltocephalinae
Cicadellidae genera